John W. DeCamp (July 6, 1941 – July 27, 2017) was an American Republican politician and author who served in the Nebraska legislature from 1971 to 1987. He served as an infantry officer in the United States Army during the Vietnam War. In 1975 he was central to organising Operation Babylift as a civilian, which evacuated 2,800 orphaned Vietnamese children. In 1992, DeCamp wrote a mass market paperback book titled The Franklin Cover-up: Child Abuse, Satanism, and Murder in Nebraska in which he alleged the supposed existence of a Franklin child prostitution ring which supposedly involved murder and Satanism.

Biography

Early Life and Legislative Career
John DeCamp was born in Neligh, Nebraska, in 1941. He joined the United States Army during the Vietnam War, attained the rank of Captain in the infantry, and was decorated for his service in Vietnam. In 1975 he initiated Operation Baby Lift, which evacuated 2,800 orphaned Vietnamese children,  and was later assigned to serve as an aide to William Colby, then-Deputy Ambassador to Vietnam.

DeCamp began his election campaign for the Nebraska State Senate while still stationed in Vietnam, was elected and served four terms as a Nebraska state senator from 1971 to 1987, during which he was described as "a strong advocate for veterans".

After the Legislature
In 1992, DeCamp wrote a mass market paperback book titled The Franklin Cover-up: Child Abuse, Satanism, and Murder in Nebraska in which he alleged that the Franklin child prostitution ring allegations were actually true and involved murder and Satanism. In 1993, DeCamp was featured in an unreleased Discovery Channel documentary called Conspiracy of Silence.

DeCamp served as a lawyer for the Militia of Montana, a militia-movement group, in the 1990s.

In 1996, DeCamp ran for the U.S. Senate as a Libertarian, but lost to Republican Chuck Hagel.

In 2006, DeCamp attempted to return to the Nebraska legislature, running for a seat in the 30th District, which consisted of Gage County and southern Lancaster County.  In the nonpartisan primary, he placed fourth of six candidates, with 12.3% of the vote; the top two vote-getters moved on to the general election, in which Norm Wallman was elected to the seat.

In Nebraska State Senator Ernie Chambers's 2008 satirical lawsuit against God, DeCamp acted as the attorney for God.

DeCamp died in Norfolk, Nebraska, on July 27, 2017.  He had suffered from Parkinson's disease and Alzheimer's disease.

Publications 
 The Franklin Cover-up: Child Abuse, Satanism, and Murder in Nebraska. Lincoln, Neb.: AWT (1992) . .
 "Special 2004/2005 edition includes new author's note and developments since earlier editions." .

References

External links
 
 The Political Graveyard: Index to Politicians

1941 births
2017 deaths
People from Neligh, Nebraska
Republican Party Nebraska state senators
American people of Dutch descent
American conspiracy theorists
Nebraska Libertarians